The EMD GP35 is a 4-axle diesel-electric locomotive built by General Motors Electro-Motive Division between July 1963 and December 1965 and by General Motors Diesel between May 1964 and January 1966.  1251 examples were built for American railroads, 26 were built for Canadian railroads and 57 were built for Mexican railroads.  Power was provided by an EMD 567D3A 16-cylinder engine which generated .

Many railroads traded in Alco FA units and EMD F-units for GP35s, reusing the trucks and traction motors. Examples with Alco trucks include those owned by Gulf, Mobile and Ohio, Southern Railway, and Ann Arbor Railroad.

Original buyers

Preservation

Some GP35s are in preservation, while others are on tourist railroads, meaning they are technically preserved.
Conway Scenic Railroad 216 regularly operates with GP38 252 on the notch train, painted in a Maine Central inspired scheme with Conway Scenic reporting marks. It was built as Norfolk and Western 1328 and was their last GP35 built. It was sold to Springfield Terminal in 1992 and renumbered to 216. It was retired and sold to Conway Scenic in 2011.
Fillmore and Western Railway 3501 and 3502 operated in year round excursion service, and sometimes appeared in films, TV shows and commercials. 3501 and 3502 were built as Pennsylvania Railroad 2262 and 2339. 3501 was sold to SMV when the Fillmore & Western Railway ceased operations in 2021 and 3502 remains on FWRY property.
Gulf Mobile and Ohio 631 is stored at the Southern Appalachia Railway Museum. It was restored and put on display in Mobile, AL in 1997, then moved for restoration in 2008.
Reading Company 3640 is under restoration at the Reading Company Technical and Historical Society in Hamburg, PA. It was the only Reading GP35 to be painted in the solid green scheme in 1974, and the society hopes to restore it to this scheme.
Savannah and Atlanta Railway 2715 is on display at the Georgia State Railroad Museum. It was the last GP35 built for any part of Southern Railway.
Watco 3533 is in service switching in Kansas City, Missouri. It was built as Wabash 547 in 1964. It was the last locomotive ever built for the Wabash. It was donated to the National Museum of Transportation in 2006, then was brought out of retirement in 2011 and shipped to Mid America Car & Locomotive to be restored to operation, then put in service in 2014.

References

 Canadian GP35s http://utahrails.net/ajkristopans/GENERALMOTORSDIESEL.php#heading_toc_j_9

Bibliography

See also 

List of GM-EMD locomotives
List of GMD Locomotives

GP35
GP35
B-B locomotives
Diesel-electric locomotives of the United States
Railway locomotives introduced in 1963
Freight locomotives
Standard gauge locomotives of the United States
Standard gauge locomotives of Canada
Standard gauge locomotives of Mexico
Diesel-electric locomotives of Canada
Diesel-electric locomotives of Mexico